884 Priamus  is a large Jupiter trojan from the Trojan camp, approximately  in diameter. It was discovered on 22 September 1917, by German astronomer Max Wolf at Heidelberg Observatory in southern Germany. The dark D-type asteroid is one of the 20 largest Jupiter trojans and has a rotation period of 6.9 hours. It was named after the Trojan king Priam from Greek mythology.

Orbit and classification 

Priamus is orbiting in the trailing Trojan camp, at Jupiter's  Lagrangian point, 60° behind its orbit in a 1:1 resonance . It is also a non-family asteroid of the Jovian background population.

It orbits the Sun at a distance of 4.5–5.8 AU once every 11 years and 10 months (4,308 days; semi-major axis of 5.18 AU). Its orbit has an eccentricity of 0.12 and an inclination of 9° with respect to the ecliptic. The body's observation arc begins at Heidelberg in November 1917, two months after its official discovery observation.

Naming 

This minor planet was named from Greek mythology after Priam (Priamus; Priamos), the king of Troy during the Trojan War. The Jupiter trojans 624 Hektor and 3317 Paris are named after his sons Paris and Hector. The official naming of Ajax was first cited in The Names of the Minor Planets by Paul Herget in 1955.

Physical characteristics 

In the Tholen taxonomy, Priamus is a dark D-type asteroid, the most common spectral type among the Jupiter trojans, with few dozens already identified in the early Tholen and SMASS classification (Bus–Binzel). Priamus has also been characterized as a D-type by Pan-STARRS survey.

Rotation period 

Several rotational lightcurves have been obtained from photometric observations since the 1980s, when Priamus was first observed by William Hartmann (1988) and Stefano Mottola (1993). The best rated result from July 2010, by Robert Stephens at GMARS  and Linda French at Illinois Wesleyan University using the 0.9-meter SMARTS telescope at CTIO in Chile, gave a well-defined rotation period of  hours with a consolidated brightness variation between 0.23 and 0.40 in magnitude.

In January 1993 and October 2001, two lightcurves were obtained by Stefano Mottola in collaboration with Claes-Ingvar Lagerkvist and Marco Delbo at Kvistaberg and Pino Torinese observatories, respectively. Another measurement was made by Ukrainian astronomers in August 2010.

Between January 2015, and December 2016, photometric observations by Robert Stephens and Daniel Coley in collaboration with Brian Warner at the Center for Solar System Studies, California, gave a three concurring periods of 6.854, 6.863 and 6.865 hours.

Diameter and albedo 

According to the surveys carried out by the Japanese Akari satellite and the NEOWISE mission of NASA's Wide-field Infrared Survey Explorer, Priamus measures 101.09 and 119.99 kilometers in diameter and its surface has an albedo of 0.044 and 0.037, respectively. The Collaborative Asteroid Lightcurve Link assumes a standard albedo for a carbonaceous asteroid of 0.057 and calculates a diameter of 96.29 kilometers based on an absolute magnitude of 8.81.

Notes

References

External links 
 Asteroid Lightcurve Database (LCDB), query form (info )
 Dictionary of Minor Planet Names, Google books
 Discovery Circumstances: Numbered Minor Planets (1)-(5000) – Minor Planet Center
 
 

000884
Discoveries by Max Wolf
Named minor planets
000884
19170922